North Carolina's eighth congressional district is a United States congressional district that comprises a large portion of the southern Piedmont area of North Carolina from Concord to Spring Lake, including China Grove, Albemarle, Troy, Pinehurst and Raeford. The district includes all of Cabarrus County, Montgomery County, Moore County, Hoke County and Stanly County, as well as portions of Rowan County and Cumberland County.

The district is currently represented by Dan Bishop, a member of the Republican Party.

Candidate filing began February 24, 2022, after the North Carolina Supreme Court approved a new map which changed the 8th district boundaries to include Anson, Davidson, Montgomery, Rowan, Stanly and Union Counties and parts of Cabarrus and Richmond Counties.

Counties 
Counties in the 2023-2025 district map.
 Anson County
 Cabarrus County (part)
 Davidson County
 Montgomery County
 Richmond County (part)
 Rowan County
 Stanly County
 Union County

List of members representing the district

Recent election results

2012

2014

2016

2018

2020

2022

See also 

North Carolina's congressional districts
List of United States congressional districts

References 

 Congressional Biographical Directory of the United States 1774–present

08